Events from the year 1809 in the United States.

Incumbents

Federal Government 
 President: Thomas Jefferson (DR-Virginia) (until March 4), James Madison (DR-Virginia) (starting March 4)
 Vice President: George Clinton (DR-New York)
 Chief Justice: John Marshall (Virginia)
 Speaker of the House of Representatives: Joseph Bradley Varnum (DR-Massachusetts)
 Congress: 10th (until March 4), 11th (starting March 4)

Events

 February 3 – Illinois Territory is created.
 February 11 – Robert Fulton patents the steamboat.
 February 17 – Miami University (Ohio) is established (by Act of February 2) on the township of land required to be set aside for it under the conditions of the Miami Purchase in 1794.
 February 20 – A decision by the Supreme Court of the United States states that the power of the federal government is greater than any individual state.
 March 1
 Non-Intercourse Act passed to replace the Embargo Act of 1807.
 Illinois Territory is effective.
 March 4 – James Madison is sworn in as the fourth President of the United States, and George Clinton is sworn in for a second term as Vice President of the United States.
 May 5 – Mary Dixon Kies becomes the first recipient of a patent granted to a woman by the United States Patent and Trademark Office. She invented a technique of weaving straw with silk and thread.
 October 11 – Along the Natchez Trace in Tennessee, explorer Meriwether Lewis dies under mysterious circumstances at an inn called Grinder's Stand. It is considered an alleged suicide though some evidence suggests murder.
 December 30 – Wearing masks at balls is forbidden in Boston, Massachusetts.

Births
 January 18 – Richard C. Gatlin, Confederate Army general (died 1896)
 January 19 – Edgar Allan Poe, author, poet, editor and literary critic (died 1849)
 February 12 – Abraham Lincoln, 16th President of the United States from 1861 till 1865 (assassinated 1865)
 February 15 – Cyrus McCormick, businessman and inventor of the mechanical reaper (died 1884)
 February 20 – Henry W. Wessells, Union Army general (died 1889)
 March 1 – Robert Cornelius, pioneer of photography (died 1893)
 March 15 – Joseph Jenkins Roberts, 1st and 7th President of Liberia (died 1876 in Liberia)
 April 21 – Robert M. T. Hunter, Virginian lawyer, politician, 14th Speaker of the United States House of Representatives, 2nd Confederate States Secretary of State (died 1887)
 July 24 – Charles W. Cathcart, Portugal-born United States Senator from Indiana from 1845 to 1853 (died 1888)
 August 1 – William B. Travis, lieutenant colonel in the Texian Army (died 1836)
 August 15 – Albert Pike, Confederate military officer, attorney, writer, and Freemason (died 1891)
 August 27 – Hannibal Hamlin, the 15th Vice President of the United States from 1861 to 1865 (died 1891)
 August 29 – Oliver Wendell Holmes Sr., physician, "fireside" poet and polymath (died 1894)
 September 20 – Sterling Price, 11th Governor of Missouri, United States Army brigadier general in the Mexican–American War, Confederate Army major general in the American Civil War (died 1867)
 September 21 – Sophia Hawthorne, painter and illustrator and wife of Nathaniel Hawthorne (died 1871)
 September 27 – Raphael Semmes, officer in the Confederate navy during the American Civil War (died 1877)
 October 11 – Orson Squire Fowler, phrenologist and leading proponent of the octagon house (died 1887)
 November 4 – Benjamin Robbins Curtis, Associate Justice of the Supreme Court of the United States (died 1874)
 November 13 – John A. Dahlgren, United States Navy officer, inventor of the Dahlgren gun (died 1870)
 November 23 – Horatio P. Van Cleve, Union army general (died 1891)
 December 3 – Thomas Alfred Davies, Union Army brigadier general (died 1899 in the United States)
 December 5 – Graham N. Fitch, United States Senator from Indiana from 1857 to 1861 (died 1892)
 December 10 – George Goldthwaite, United States Senator from Alabama from 1871 till 1877 (died 1879)

Deaths
 January 21 – Josiah Hornblower, statesman and delegate for New Jersey in the Continental Congress in 1785 and 1786 (born 1729)
 March 6 – Thomas Heyward Jr., signer of the United States Declaration of Independence and of the Articles of Confederation (born 1746)
 June 8 – Thomas Paine, political activist, philosopher, Founding Father of the United States and author of Common Sense (born 1737 in Great Britain)
 October 11 – Meriwether Lewis, leader of the Corps of Discovery (born 1774)
 November 4 – Gabriel Manigault, architect (born 1758)

See also
Timeline of United States history (1790–1819)

References

Further reading
 William S. Appleton, Robert C. Winthrop. "Original Bank Circular, 1809". Proceedings of the Massachusetts Historical Society, Vol. 11, (1869–1870)
 Thomas H. Shoemaker. A List of the Inhabitants of Germantown and Chestnut Hill in 1809. The Pennsylvania Magazine of History and Biography, Vol. 16, No. 1 (April, 1892), pp. 42–63
 An Itinerary to Niagara Falls in 1809. The Pennsylvania Magazine of History and Biography, Vol. 24, No. 2 (1900), pp. 200–202
 Ellmore Barce. Governor Harrison and the Treaty of Fort Wayne, 1809. Indiana Magazine of History, Vol. 11, No. 4 (1915), pp. 352–367
 Charles Lyon Chandler. United States Shipping in the La Plata Region, 1809–1810. The Hispanic American Historical Review, Vol. 3, No. 2 (May 1920), pp. 159–176
 Joshua Gilpin. Journal of a Tour from Philadelphia Thro the Western Counties of Pennsylvania in the Months of September and October, 1809. The Pennsylvania Magazine of History and Biography, Vol. 50, No. 1 (1926), pp. 64–78
 A trip from Fort Wayne to Fort Dearborn in 1809. Indiana Magazine of History, Vol. 36, No. 1 (1940), pp. 45–51
 Edwin J. Hipkiss. A Cabinetmaker's Bill: Boston, 1809. Bulletin of the Museum of Fine Arts, Vol. 45, No. 259 (February, 1947), pp. 12–14
 Noble E. Cunningham Jr. The Diary of Frances Few, 1808–1809. The Journal of Southern History, Vol. 29, No. 3 (August, 1963), pp. 345–361
 William G. McLoughlin. Thomas Jefferson and the Beginning of Cherokee Nationalism, 1806 to 1809. The William and Mary Quarterly, Third Series, Vol. 32, No. 4 (October, 1975), pp. 548–580.
 Jeffrey A. Frankel. The 1807–1809 Embargo Against Great Britain. The Journal of Economic History, Vol. 42, No. 2 (June, 1982), pp. 291–308.
 James M. O'Toole. From Advent to Easter: Catholic Preaching in New York City, 1808–1809. Church History, Vol. 63, No. 3 (September, 1994), pp. 365–377

External links
 

 
1800s in the United States
United States
United States
Years of the 19th century in the United States